Kanana Sundari is a 1988 Indian Malayalam-language film directed by P. Chandrakumar and produced by S. Kumar. The film stars P. Sukumar and Abhilasha in the lead roles. The film has musical score by Jerry Amaldev.

Plot

Cast
P. Sukumar (Kiran)
Abhilasha
Vidyasree
Roshni
Jaffer Khan
Gajendra Chouhan

Soundtrack
The music was composed by Jerry Amaldev and the lyrics were written by Devadas.

References

External links
 

1988 films
1980s Malayalam-language films
Films directed by P. Chandrakumar